Mumtaz Khan may refer to:

Mumtaz Ahmed Khan (humanitarian) (1935–2021), Indian founder of the Al-Ameen Educational Society
Mumtaz Ahmed Khan (Jammu and Kashmir politician), Indian politician from Jammu and Kashmir
Mumtaz Ahmed Khan (Telangana politician) (born 1949), Indian politician from Telangana
Mumtaz Hussain Khan (born 1973), Pakistani politician